Dominic Imhof (born July 28, 1982) is a Canadian soccer player who currently plays for FC Tuggen in the 1.Liga Gruppe 3.

Club career
Imhof began his career at BV United Smithers Gunners and moved in 2001 to FC St. Gallen to play for their youth and reserve teams. He moved in 2005 to FC Gossau played here his first 7 games as a professional and signed in January 2008 with FC Tuggen. In summer 2009, he signed up with FC Rapperswil-Jona, before returned in January 2010 to FC Tuggen.

Position
He is variable defensive player and can play in the left or right midfield and as right defender.

International career
Imhof earned his first call-up for Canada on 26 May 2009 and played his first senior national game on 30 May 2009 in a friendly game against Cyprus, he played two minutes.

Personal life
Dominic is the younger brother of Daniel Imhof.

References

External links
  (archive)
 

1982 births
Association football midfielders
Canada men's international soccer players
Canadian expatriate soccer players
Canadian expatriate sportspeople in Germany
Canadian people of Swiss-German descent
Canadian soccer players
FC Gossau players
Living people
Naturalized citizens of Canada
People from Grande Prairie
Swiss expatriate footballers
Swiss men's footballers
FC Rapperswil-Jona players